The Stuhlmann's elephant shrew (Rhynchocyon stuhlmanni) is a species of elephant shrew that lives in the forests and savannas of Africa.  It was discovered in 1893 and declared a new species. In the 1960s, however, it was downgraded to a subspecies of checkered sengi (Rhynchocyon cirnei).  In 2018, following genetic tests, scientists re-evaluated the mammal as a full species again.

The elephant shrew is named after Franz Stuhlmann, a German zoologist, whose name is also found on a variety of other Central African species and subspecies, including Stuhlmann's golden mole (Chrysochloris stuhlmanni), Stuhlmann's double-collared sunbird (Cinnyris stuhlmanni), Stuhlmann's starling (Poeoptera stuhlmanni), Stuhlmann's weaver (Ploceus baglafecht stuhlmanni), and Stuhlmann's blue monkey (Cercopithecus mitis stuhlmanni).

References

Elephant shrews